The YM Museum of Marine Exploration Kaohsiung (MOME) is a museum about marine exploration in Cijin District, Kaohsiung, Taiwan.

History
After its rental tenure was approved by the Marine Bureau of the Kaohsiung City Government on 18 January 2007, Yang Ming Marine Transport Corporation established the Museum of Marine Exploration in Cijin Harbor, Kaohsiung. After refurbishment, the museum was officially opened on 28 December 2007 as the YM Museum of Marine Exploration Kaohsiung.

Architecture
The museum is a two-storey building shaped like an ocean liner.
 Its boat-shaped structure appears as a large ship docked along Kaohsiung Harbor.

Facilities
The museum has the following areas for exhibitions, etc.

First floor
 Two exhibition halls
 3D animation cinema
 Multi-function conference room

Second floor
 Two open air areas for café and performance area
 Viewing platform

See also
 List of museums in Taiwan
 YM Oceanic Culture and Art Museum
 Yang Ming Marine Transport Corporation
 Maritime industries of Taiwan

References

External links
 

2007 establishments in Taiwan
Exploration of Asia
Maritime museums in Taiwan
Museums established in 2007
Museums in Kaohsiung
Oceanographic organizations